Ishrat Husain is a Pakistani banker and economist who served as the dean of the Institute of Business Administration (2008-2016) and the Governor of the State Bank of Pakistan (1999-2006). He presently serves as Advisor to Prime Minister Imran Khan for Institutional Reforms & Austerity, in office since August 2018.

Life

He received his M.A in development economics in 1972 from the Williams College and his PhD from the Boston University in 1978. He joined the World Bank in 1979, working initially as the country economist for Liberia. In 1994, Husain became the chief economist for Asia-Pacific region and between 1997 and 1999 headed World Bank's operations in Central Asia. He ended his World Bank career in 1999, and was appointed as the Governor of the State Bank of Pakistan and remained until December 2005.

In 2008, he was appointed as the Dean of IBA Karachi, in 2015 he was awarded the Nishan-e-Imtiaz by President Mamnoon. He resigned as the dean of IBA in 2016, however remains the Professor Emeritus of the institute. During his tenure, IBA expanded from a solely business school to an interdisciplinary university. In 2016, Hussain joined the Woodrow Wilson Center as a resident policy fellow.

Awards and Achievements

Jinnah Award (2005) for services to people as Governor of the State Bank of Pakistan.

References

Publications
Papers & Articles
Books & Monographs
Refereed Journal Articles

External links
Official website of State Bank of Pakistan
 IBA site profile
 

Williams College alumni
Boston University alumni
Governors of the State Bank of Pakistan
Recipients of Nishan-e-Imtiaz
Living people
Muhajir people
Pakistani civil servants
1941 births
People from Karachi
Executive Directors of the Institute of Business Administration, Karachi